Noble Township may refer to:

Illinois
 Noble Township, Richland County, Illinois

Indiana
 Noble Township, Cass County, Indiana
 Noble Township, Jay County, Indiana
 Noble Township, LaPorte County, Indiana
 Noble Township, Noble County, Indiana
 Noble Township, Rush County, Indiana
 Noble Township, Shelby County, Indiana
 Noble Township, Wabash County, Indiana

Iowa
 Noble Township, Cass County, Iowa

Kansas
 Noble Township, Dickinson County, Kansas
 Noble Township, Ellsworth County, Kansas
 Noble Township, Marshall County, Kansas, in Marshall County, Kansas

Michigan
 Noble Township, Michigan

Missouri
 Noble Township, Ozark County, Missouri, in Ozark County, Missouri

Nebraska
 Noble Township, Valley County, Nebraska

North Dakota
 Noble Township, Cass County, North Dakota, in Cass County, North Dakota

Ohio
 Noble Township, Auglaize County, Ohio
 Noble Township, Defiance County, Ohio
 Noble Township, Noble County, Ohio

Township name disambiguation pages